Raoul Got (11 October 1900 – 20 November 1955) was a French rugby union player who competed in the 1924 Summer Olympics. He was born, and died, in Perpignan. In 1924 he won the silver medal as member of the French team.

References

External links
profile

1900 births
1955 deaths
Sportspeople from Perpignan
French rugby union players
Olympic rugby union players of France
Rugby union players at the 1924 Summer Olympics
Olympic silver medalists for France
France international rugby union players
Medalists at the 1924 Summer Olympics